Grimes Brothers Mill, also known as Lexington Roller Mill and Excelsior Mill, is a historic flour mill located at Lexington, Davidson County, North Carolina. It was built about 1885, and is a four-story brick building with a basement.  It measures approximately 34 feet by 40 feet and has a shallow-pitched shed roof. The mill remained in operation until about 1960, and the building was converted to bank use in the early 1960s.

It was added to the National Register of Historic Places in 2002.

References

Grinding mills in North Carolina
Grinding mills on the National Register of Historic Places in North Carolina
Industrial buildings completed in 1885
Buildings and structures in Davidson County, North Carolina
National Register of Historic Places in Davidson County, North Carolina
1885 establishments in North Carolina